Eperua falcata, the bootlace tree, is a species of flowering plant in the family Fabaceae, native to northern South America. Capable of growing in pure white sand, its timber is valued for its resistance to decay and is used for shingles, telephone poles, and similar applications.

References

Detarioideae
Flora of Colombia
Flora of northern South America
Flora of North Brazil
Plants described in 1775